Petr Benda (born March 25, 1982) is a Czech professional basketball player, who currently plays for Basketball Nymburk. He also represented the senior Czech Republic national team. Benda plays at the power forward and center positions.

Professional career
Benda started his pro career in 2000–01, with BK Jihlava. For the following season, he signed with BVV Brno, where he played until 2007. Then, he signed with the Czech powerhouse Basketball Nymburk, which he would also play with in the EuroCup.

National team career
Benda was a member of the senior Czech national team. He represented the Czech Republic at the following tournaments: the 2007 EuroBasket, the 2013 EuroBasket, the 2015 EuroBasket, and the 2016 Belgrade FIBA World Olympic Qualifying Tournament.

Czech national team stats

References

External links
FIBA Profile
FIBA Europe Profile
EuroCup Profile
FIBA Champions League Profile
Eurobasket.com Profile

1982 births
Living people
Basketball Nymburk players
BC Brno players
Centers (basketball)
Czech men's basketball players
Power forwards (basketball)
Sportspeople from Jihlava